Doric dialect may refer to:
Doric Greek, a Greek dialect
Doric dialect (Scotland), a Scots dialect